Berne is a municipality in the district of Wesermarsch, in Lower Saxony, Germany. It is on the left bank of the Weser, approximately 20 km east of Oldenburg and 25 km northwest of Bremen.

Notable people
The Canadian photographer Leonard Frank (1870-1944) was born in Berne. It is also the birthplace of musician, producer and songwriter Dieter Bohlen.

References

Wesermarsch